Mersin İdmanyurdu (also Mersin İdman Yurdu, Mersin İY, or MİY) Sports Club; located in Mersin, east Mediterranean coast of Turkey in 2009–10. Mersin İdmanyurdu football team has finished 2008–09 season in second place in TFF Second League Promotion Group and promoted to 2009–10 TFF First League. This was the second promotion of the team and MİY became the first team that promoted to TFF First League twice. After formation of the league in 2001 (as Lig A), MİY became second team which relegated and then promoted again, after Adanaspor (the third became Çanakkale Dardanelspor after promotion play-offs in 2008–09 season. Mersin idmanyurdu participated in 2009–10 Turkish Cup and eliminated at third round, which was the play-off round for group stage. In play-off game Antalyaspor beat MİY after 11 penalties.

Ali Kahramanlı was club president. Serhat Güller was head coach at the start of the season. Ergün Penbe took over the position after 20th round. Goalkeeper Kerem İnan was the most appeared player, while Caner Ağca and Tunç Behram were top goalscorers.

2009–10 TFF First League participation
2009–10 TFF First League was played as Bank Asya Birinci Lig due to sponsorship reasons. 18 teams attended. The winners and runners-up were promoted to 2010–11 Süper Lig. The third team to be promoted was determined through Promotion Group games organized as a one-leg league system. Bottom three teams were relegated to 2010–11 TFF Second League.

Results summary
Mersin İdmanyurdu (MİY) 2009–10 TFF First League season league summary:

Sources: 2013–14 TFF First League pages.

League table
Mersin İdmanyurdu (MİY) 2009–10 TFF First League season place in league table.

Results by round
Results of games MİY played in 2009–10 TFF First League by rounds:

First half
Mersin idmanyurdu has started to league with a claim of direct promotion to 2010–11 Süper Lig. During the first transfer period contacts were signed with 15 new transfers and 3 newly professionalized ones. On the other hand, ways were parted with 17 previous season players. In the first half, however, the team has shown an undulant profile and become eleventh. The club management revised the goal for the rest of the season as taking sixth position. At the end of first half, contracts with 11 players were terminated (6 of which were new transfers of first transfer period, 2009–10) and nine players resigned (6 new transfer, 2 loans, 1 newly professionalized) before the start of the second half.

Mersin İdmanyurdu (MİY) 2009–10 TFF First League season first half game reports is shown in the following table:
Kick off times are in EET and EEST.

Sources: 2009–10 TFF First League pages.

Second half
In the second half of the season, MİY had a bad starting. After 20th week, head coach Serhat Güller resigned. New head coach Ergün Penbe watched 21st week game at Giresun among audience and signed on 10 February 2010 with commitment messages to fans related to a better league results: "nothing has finished yet." However, as the time takes the team has shown an instable performance; and couldn't score goals in many matches. Therefore, at the end of the league the aim of the team was revised as "remaining in the league". MİY played a relegation game in the last game of the season with Hacettepespor, and remained in the league next season.

Mersin İdmanyurdu (MİY) 2009–10 TFF First League season second half game reports is shown in the following table:
Kick off times are in EET and EEST.

Sources: 2009–10 TFF First League pages.

2009–10 Turkish Cup participation
2009–10 Turkish Cup was played with 71 teams in three stages. The 48th Cup was played as Ziraat Türkiye Kupası for sponsorship reasons. In the first stage 2 elimination rounds and a play-off round were played in one-leg elimination system. In the second stage 20 remaining teams played one-led round-robin group games in 4 groups, 5 teams in each group. In the third stage; quarter- and semifinals and finals played again in one-leg elimination rule. Finals played at a neutral venue. It was determined by TFF that MİY take place in 2009–10 Turkish Cup starting from the first round and was eliminated at play-offs round. Trabzonspor won the Cup for 8th time.

Cup track
The drawings and results Mersin İdmanyurdu (MİY) followed in 2009–10 Turkish Cup are shown in the following table.

Note: In the above table 'Score' shows For and Against goals whether the match played at home or not.

Game details
Mersin İdmanyurdu (MİY) 2009–10 Turkish Cup game reports is shown in the following table.
Kick off times are in EET and EEST.

Source: 2009–10 Turkish Cup pages.

Management

Club management
Mersin İdmanyurdu Sports Club president and managerial board members are elected by general vote of club members. Last election was held in September 2008.
 Executive committee:President : Ali Kahramanlı since September 2008. Football Division Manager: Mehmet Işık (replaced resigning Mustafa Ağaoğlu in December 2009).

Coaching team
 Before 10 February 2010: Coach: Serhat Güller. Trainers: Enver Şen, Alper Şemsi Edis, Ahmet Arslaner, Mehmet Varlıer (goalkeeping trainer). Sports Director: Ahmet Yıldırım, since August 2009.
 After 10 February 2010: Coach: Ergün Penbe. Trainers: Kemalettin Şentürk, Volkan Kilimci, and Ali Asım. U-14 team coach: Serkan Damla. Advisor: Bülent Uygun

2009–10 Mersin İdmanyurdu head coaches

Note: Only official games were included.

2009–10 squad
Appearances, goals and cards count for 2009–10 TFF First League and 2009–10 Turkish Cup games. Serial penalties were not included in goal statistics. Kit numbers were allowed to be selected by players. 18 players appeared in each game roster, three to be replaced. Only the players who appeared in game rosters were included and listed in order of appearance.

Sources: TFF club page and Maçkolik team page.

U-23 team
TFF organized A2 League in 2009–10 season. Süper Lig and 1. Lig teams participated in this league. League was organized in four geographical groups and top two teams are labeled for play-off group. Mersin İdmanyurdu A2 team took place in Güney (South) group with other eight southern and central Anatolian cities' teams.

See also
 Football in Turkey
 2009–10 TFF First League
 2009–10 Turkish Cup

Notes and references

2009-10
Turkish football clubs 2009–10 season